Chapak-e Nazemi Mahalleh (also Romanized as Chapak-e Nāz̧emī Maḩalleh; also known as Chabak, Chapak, Chapak-e Nāz̧emī, Chapak-e Vāz̧emī, and Chubuk) is a village in Gafsheh-ye Lasht-e Nesha Rural District, Lasht-e Nesha District, Rasht County, Gilan Province, Iran. At the 2006 census, its population was 417, in 139 families.

References 

Populated places in Rasht County